The 2017–18 NCAA Division III men's ice hockey season began on October 21, 2017, and concluded on March 24, 2018. This was the 45th season of Division III college ice hockey.

The two Division II schools, (Saint Anselm and Saint Michael's) that had played in the New England Hockey Conference for years, formally left the league and began playing a full Northeast-10 Conference schedule.

As had been announced in 2016, seven members of ECAC West, the last remaining ECAC conference at the Division III level, left to form the United Collegiate Hockey Conference along with two new men's programs. The remaining school, Hobart, joined the NEHC.

Regular season

Season tournaments

Standings

Note: Mini-game are not included in final standings

2018 NCAA Tournament

Source:

See also
 2017–18 NCAA Division I men's ice hockey season
 2017–18 NCAA Division II men's ice hockey season

References

External links

 
NCAA